A dub siren is a type of synthesizer used predominantly in Dub. It is usually a relatively simple oscillator, housed in a box, often allowing for a variety of waveforms to be altered by turning potentiometers controlling pitch, rate and other parameters. Dub sirens are frequently activated by a button, sometimes able to be toggled between continuous synthesis with one button press, or sound emission only when the button is held.

Usage
Thought to have been originated by sound systems, dub sirens are used predominantly to generate a series of rhythmic pitches in dub and reggae music.

See also
 Kraakdoos
 Atari Punk Console

References

Synthesizers